Olavide may refer to:

 Pablo de Olavide University, university in Seville, Spain.
 Miguel Olavide (born 1996), Spanish footballer. 
 Pablo de Olavide (1725-1803), Spanish politician.
 José Eugenio Olavide (1831-1901), Spanish dermatologist.